Markets in Lagos, Nigeria, offer a broad and diverse range of new, second-hand goods, products and merchandise for consumers.

Notable markets in Lagos include:

( Agbalata market badagry lagos )
 Alaba international market
 Ajah Market 
 Aratumi Market
 Balogun Market, Lagos Island
 Bar Beach Market
 Computer Village
 Èbúté Èrò Market, Lagos Island
 Epe Fish Market
 Iyana-Iba Market
 Ikotun Market
 Idumota Market
 Ita Faji Market
 Isale Eko Market, Lagos Island
 Jankarra Market, Lagos Island
 Ladipo Market
 Lekki Market
 Agboju Market
 Daleko Market
 Morocco I and II markets
 Mushin market
 Oyingbo Market
 Mile 12 Market
Oniru New Market 
 Fespar market
 Oshodi Market
 Rauf Aregbesola Market
 Téjúoshó Market
 Sangotedo Market
 Ajuwe Market
 Jakande Market
 Akodo Market, Epe
 Boundary Seafood Market
 Apongbo Market (household and souvenirs)
 Liverpool Crayfish Market
 Arena Market
 Cele Market
 Ijesha Market, Ijeshatedo
 State Market
 Agege Market
 Jankara Market, Ijaiye
 Owode Onirin
 Amu market
 Onipanu iron rod market
 Odunade market Orile
 Ojuwoye Market
 Plaintain Market
 Ladipo Paper Market
 Aswani Market
 Leather market

References

Further reading

External links

 Postcard of market at Ebute Ero, Lagos, ca.1920

Ketu Market 
Ikorodu carriage market

Lagos-related lists
 
Lagos